Albert Moché (11 February 1885 – 6 February 1977) was a French long-distance runner. He competed in the marathon at the 1920 Summer Olympics.

References

1885 births
1977 deaths
Athletes (track and field) at the 1920 Summer Olympics
French male long-distance runners
French male marathon runners
Olympic athletes of France
20th-century French people